Evan Marshall may refer to:

 Evan Marshall (cricketer) (born 1970), New Zealand cricketer
 Evan Marshall (agent) (born 1956), literary agent and author
 Evan Marshall (baseball) (born 1990), American baseball pitcher
 Evan Marshall (musician), mandolinist